Kay Rose (February 12, 1922 – December 11, 2002) was an American sound editor. She received a Special Achievement Academy Award during the 57th Academy Awards in 1985. This was in the category of Best Sound Editing for the film The River.
She has 68 credits in TV and film from 1954 to 1999.

She was also the first female sound editor to win an Oscar.

In 1999 she received the Lifetime Achievement award at the Motion Picture Sound Editors and in 2002 she received the CAS Career Achievement Award at the Cinema Audio Society awards.

Personal life

Kay Rose was married to film editor Sherman A. Rose in 1951, which resulted in a divorce. Together they had a daughter Victoria Rose Sampson who is also a sound editor.

References

External links
 

American sound editors
Special Achievement Academy Award winners
Best Sound Editing Academy Award winners
1922 births
2002 deaths
People from New York City
Deaths from organ failure
Women audio engineers
Women sound editors
CAS Career Achievement Award honorees